Akakor is the name of an alleged ancient underground city, located somewhere between Brazil, Bolivia and Peru, revealed as the product of a hoax.

It was described by German journalist Karl Brugger, based on interviews with a self-proclaimed Brazilian Indian chieftain Tatunca Nara in his book The Chronicle of Akakor (1976). Although Brugger was apparently convinced, the information's only source Tatunca Nara was later exposed by activist and adventurer Rüdiger Nehberg as being Günther Hauck, a German.

Elements of the story from The Chronicle of Akakor were used in the film
Indiana Jones and the Kingdom of the Crystal Skull, where they were conflated with El Dorado, although references are to "Akator".

The city was the subject of the TV series Curse Of The Lost Amazon Gold on Sky History.

Akakor in popular culture

Games 
 Art of Murder: FBI Confidential (2008)

References

External links
 Karl Brugger: Die Chronik von Akakor, Econ Publishers: Düsseldorf, Vienna, 1976
 The legend of Akakor
 Article about underground secrets of South America

Ancient astronaut speculation
Pseudohistory
Pseudoarchaeology
South America in fiction
Fictional populated places
20th-century hoaxes